The 2018–19 season was Stoke City's 102nd season in the Football League, the 42nd in the second tier and fifth in the Championship.

Following last season's relegation from the Premier League, Stoke replaced Paul Lambert with Gary Rowett who was tasked with mounting a promotion challenge. Inevitably there were a large number of departures and new arrivals during the summer, Stoke spending over £30 million on Benik Afobe, Sam Clucas, Peter Etebo, Tom Ince and James McClean. However Stoke made a bad start to the campaign losing against Leeds United, Wigan Athletic and West Bromwich Albion. Stoke struggled to close the gap on the play-off positions despite going on a ten-game unbeaten run of which six were draws and ended 2018 in mid-table. Rowett was sacked at the beginning of January 2019 and was replaced by Luton Town's Nathan Jones.

Despite an early victory over Leeds United it soon became apparent that a squad re-build would be required so Jones experimented with his squad for the remainder of the campaign with Stoke eventually finishing in 16th position after drawing a record 22 times (of which nine were 0–0).

Pre-season 
Stoke were relegated from the Premier League after a 2–1 defeat to Crystal Palace on 5 May 2018. Following relegation, Jack Butland and Charlie Adam criticised the club's transfer policy and the behaviour of some of their teammates. John Coates and Peter Coates released a joint statement where they admitted that a major overhaul is required and that they should have dismissed Mark Hughes earlier. Paul Lambert left Stoke on 18 May 2018 by mutual consent after winning just two of his 15 games in charge. The board decided to go for Derby County manager Gary Rowett, and he signed a three-year contract on 22 May after the clubs agreed compensation. He brought with him four coaches, Callum Davidson, Rory Delap, Kevin Phillips & Mark Sale.

Following relegation there was as expected major transfer activity made by the club prior to the start of the season. Going out were, Lee Grant to Manchester United, Stephen Ireland and Glen Johnson both released, Xherdan Shaqiri to Liverpool, Ramadan Sobhi to Huddersfield Town and Kevin Wimmer on loan to Hannover 96. Arriving at Stoke were goalkeeper Adam Federici, experienced centre back Ashley Williams, Nigerian midfielder Peter Etebo, wingers Tom Ince and James McClean and forward Benik Afobe.

Stoke returned to training in late June and played a behind close doors match against Macclesfield Town on 10 July, winning 5–2. City's first public outing was against Walsall at the Bescot Stadium. Goals from Ibrahim Afellay, Bojan and Peter Crouch gave Stoke a 3–0 win. The squad then spent a week at a training camp in Herzlake, Germany. They played three matches against VfL Bochum, SV Meppen and Hamburger SV, City losing all three games. Stoke then played out a goalless draw at home to Wolverhampton Wanderers. Stoke ended their pre-season with a 2–0 defeat at FC St. Pauli.

Championship

August
Stoke began the campaign away at Leeds United and made a terrible start, being well beat 3–1. Stoke were 2–0 down at half time with goals from Mateusz Klich and Pablo Hernández. Stoke pulled one back with Benik Afobe scoring a penalty but a Liam Cooper header ensured a Leeds win. City's first home match ended in a 1–1 draw against Brentford. Afobe scored for Stoke capitalising on a mistake from Chris Mepham and keeper Daniel Bentley. Stoke were unimpressive throughout the match and Brentford earned a deserved point thanks to an Ollie Watkins strike. After the match Rowett said that some of his players "need to wake up". Stoke drew again this time 2–2 at Preston North End. Preston took the lead through a Paul Gallagher penalty after Tom Edwards had handled in the area. Stoke responded immediately with Erik Pieters scoring a rare goal however Graham Burke fired North End back in front just before half time. Peter Crouch rescued a point for Stoke with a towering header. Stoke were then easily beaten 3–0 at home by Wigan Athletic. Rowett made several changes to his team for the visit of Hull City. Stoke were able to gain their first win of the season with goals from James McClean and an own goal from Tigers defender Jordy de Wijs.

September
Prior to the match against West Bromwich Albion Rowett trimmed his squad by loaning out Badou Ndiaye, Geoff Cameron, Giannelli Imbula and Julien Ngoy whilst Eric Maxim Choupo-Moting joined Paris Saint-Germain on a free transfer. Stoke were beaten 2–1 by the Baggies with a brace from Dwight Gayle and a consolation strike by Pieters. Rowett was again critical of his players following the match calling them "dopey". After the international break Stoke traveled to Hillsborough to take on Sheffield Wednesday. Stoke made a good start to the match with Afobe scoring twice early on. However The Owls earned a 2–2 draw with goals from Marco Matias and Barry Bannan. Stoke then went on to beat Swansea City 1–0 with Joe Allen scoring the only goal against his former club. The Potters then faced Tony Mowbray's Blackburn Rovers where another awful defensive display saw them 3–0 down after 46 minutes. Stoke pulled two goals back through Saido Berahino and Tom Ince and did have a chance to draw level but Berahino missed a late penalty and it finished 3–2 to Rovers. Stoke's defensive woes continued in the final match of September at Rotherham United. Despite dominating the first half The Millers scored twice within minutes of the restart with a Ryan Manning penalty and Richie Towell's close-range finish. Stoke made a comeback with goals from Ince and Bojan and the match finished in a 2–2 draw.

October
Stoke opened October by defeating Phil Parkinson's Bolton Wanderers 2–0 with goals from Ince and a rare header from Bruno Martins Indi. City then won back to back matches for the first time since January 2017 with a 1–0 away success at Norwich City, Timm Klose scoring an own goal. After the international break Stoke lost 1–0 at home to Birmingham City with Rowett being sent to the stands after Stoke were denied a late penalty. Stoke then drew 1–1 at Sheffield United with a Joe Allen free kick cancelling out a goal from Leon Clarke. The Potters ended October with a hard-fought win away at Bristol City with Darren Fletcher volleying in the only goal. In the second half Jack Butland made a number of fine saves to deny the Robins.

November
Former manager Tony Pulis brought his Middlesbrough side to Stoke on 3 November which saw both sides cancel each other out in a goalless draw. City again drew 0–0 the following week away at midlands rivals Nottingham Forest. There was some controversy in the match as Forest keeper Costel Pantilimon avoided a red card after rushing out of his area and bringing down Afobe. Following the final international break of 2018 Stoke returned to league football with a visit from Queens Park Rangers. After going 1–0 down through an early Àngel Rangel header Stoke turned the game around with goals from Berahino and Allen. However Stoke were unable to see out the victory as Rangel scored again to earn QPR a 2–2 draw. Stoke then came up against manager Gary Rowett's former team Derby County whose supporters were unhappy with the way he left them, which gave the match a spiky atmosphere. Sam Clucas scored his first goal for the club after 24 minutes before Peter Etebo was sent off for a high tackle on Richard Keogh. A scuffle broke out between Joe Allen and Bradley Johnson where Johnson appeared to try and bite Allen. Johnson was later given a retrospective ban by the FA. Harry Wilson equalized for the Rams just after half time via a free-kick but Stoke won 2–1 with former Derby player Tom Ince getting the winning goal.

December
Stoke then missed the opportunity to close the gap on the play-off positions against lowly Reading. Stoke were guilty of wasteful finishing before Marc McNulty headed the Royals in front just before half time. City turned the game around in the second half with Afobe ending a ten-game run without a goal and a fine volley from Tom Ince, however Modou Barrow fired in a stoppage time equaliser. Stoke faced Paul Lambert's rock bottom Ipswich Town on 8 December and won 2–0 with goals from Ince and Allen, although the team came in criticism from supporters for a poor display against weak opposition. Stoke extended their unbeaten run to nine games with another 2–2 draw this time away at Aston Villa. Stoke were leading twice through Allen and then an Afobe penalty and on both occasions Villa responded with a penalty from Tammy Abraham and a late header from Jonathan Kodjia. Stoke then labored to a 1–0 home win over relegation threatened Millwall, Berahino heading in the only goal on 61 minutes. Stoke's ten match unbeaten run was ended by Birmingham City on boxing day with goals from Jacques Maghoma and Omar Bogle. Stoke ended a forgettable 2018 with a drab 0–0 draw at relegation threatened Bolton Wanderers which prompted an angry reaction by the traveling supporters who chanted against Rowett.

January
Stoke began 2019 with a 2–0 home defeat against Bristol City with Famara Diedhiou scoring twice after Afobe had missed an early penalty which lead to more angry reactions towards Rowett from supporters. Inevitably Rowett was sacked by the club the following week. The Stoke board moved quickly to appoint Luton Town's Welsh manager Nathan Jones. Jones's first match in charge was away at Thomas Frank's Brentford. The size of the re-building job quickly became apparent to Jones as the Bees rushed into a 2–0 lead before Afobe pulled one back for Stoke, however Rico Henry ensured three points for Brentford. The buildup to Nathan Jones' first home match took a bizarre twist as Leeds United manager Marcelo Bielsa admitted that he had been sending members of his staff to spy on Championship opponents training sessions. To counter this Jones set Stoke up in a 3–5–2 formation with 19-year-old Tyrese Campbell given his first league start and Charlie Adam and Moritz Bauer returning to the team after being outcast by Rowett. Stoke produced their best display of the season against the league leaders, winning 2–1 with goals from Clucas and Allen, whilst Ezgjan Alioski scored a consolation for Leeds who had Pontus Jansson sent-off. Stoke ended January with a 2–0 home defeat against Preston.

Jones began to trim his squad in the January transfer window, departing the club were Ibrahim Afellay who had his contract terminated, Cuco Martina's loan spell cancelled, Erik Pieters going out on loan and most notably the long serving Peter Crouch joining Burnley. Jones brought in two players, defender Danny Batth from Wolverhampton Wanderers and striker Sam Vokes from Burnley.

February
Stoke's new additions Batth and Vokes both started away at in-form Hull City, Stoke again losing 2–0 with goals from Jarrod Bowen and Kamil Grosicki, with Vokes missing a penalty. City then lost a third in a row without scoring, going down 1–0 to promotion hopefuls West Bromwich Albion. On 12 February Gordon Banks died at the age of 81, he helped Stoke win the 1972 League Cup and England the 1966 FIFA World Cup, supporters paid tribute to him at his statue outside the bet365 Stadium. Stoke then kept a first clean sheet under Jones away at Wigan Athletic but failed to find the net for a fourth match in a drab goalless draw. Stoke's barren run continued as they could only muster a 1–1 draw away at bottom of the table, Ipswich Town. Stoke paid their respects to Gordon Banks before the match against Aston Villa with Jack Butland wearing a special classic green goalkeeping top. The match itself ended in another 1–1 draw, Sam Vokes' first goal for the club being cancelled out by Albert Adomah.

March
The following week Stoke ended a run of six games without a win against play-off chasing Nottingham Forest, with fine strikes from Afobe and Peter Etebo's first for the club. City then travelled to Loftus Road to face fellow mid-table side Queens Park Rangers. Sam Clucas was sent-off inside the opening 10 minutes of the match for stamping on Josh Scowen. The team produced a dogged defensive performance from then on and frustrated Rangers who had Grant Hall dismissed for two bookable offenses and the match ended goalless. Four days later Stoke ground out another drab goalless draw this time at play-off contenders Derby County. The Potters began their next match at home to Reading brightly hitting the woodwork twice through Ince and then Vokes but that was as good as it got as Stoke played out yet another goalless draw. Following the international break Stoke took on Sheffield Wednesday and played out a fourth consecutive goalless draw.

April
Stoke ended their barren run in front of goal with a 1–0 success away at Blackburn Rovers, Peter Etebo scoring the only goal after 14 minutes. Stoke were then easily beaten away at Swansea City 3–1, with Martins Indi and Tom Edwards both being sent-off. Stoke followed this up with another poor performance this time against Rotherham United blowing a 2–0 half time lead to draw 2–2. Stoke lost 1–0 away at Middlesbrough on Good Friday with Britt Assombalonga scoring after only two minutes. On Easter Monday Stoke played against top of the table Norwich City. Onel Hernandez gave the Canaries a first half lead before a much improved second half display from Stoke saw Ashley Williams and Tom Edwards score their first goals for the club either side of a Teemu Pukki header. Stoke ended April with a ninth goalless draw of the season away at Millwall.

May
Stoke ended a hugely disappointing 2018–19 campaign against promoted Sheffield United. Sam Vokes volleyed Stoke in front after 19 minutes which was cancelled out by Kieran Dowell. Shawcross scored a rare goal to restore City's lead but Enda Stevens ensured Stoke would draw a 22nd match of the season.

Results

League table

FA Cup

Stoke were draw away against EFL League One side Shrewsbury Town in the third round and could only manage a 1–1 draw with Peter Crouch cancelling out Oliver Norburn's penalty, sending the tie to a replay. In the replay Stoke took a 2–0 lead through Tyrese Campbell's first senior goals before a second half capitulation saw them beaten 3–2.

EFL Cup

Stoke were draw at home to Huddersfield Town in the second round of the EFL Cup. Stoke won 2–0 against the Terriers with goals from Saido Berahino, ending his 48-game run without scoring and a bizarre own goal from Juninho Bacuna. Stoke exited the EFL Cup in the third round, losing 3–2 away at Nottingham Forest.

Squad statistics

Transfers

In

Out

Loans in

Loans out

References

Stoke City
Stoke City F.C. seasons